Generał. Zamach na Gibraltarze (English: General. Assassination on Gibraltar) is a Polish historical film, based on the last days of General Władysław Sikorski during World War II. It was released in 2009; it was directed by Anna Jadowska; Krzysztof Pieczynski plays General Sikorski.

It focuses on the controversial 1943 Gibraltar B-24 crash in which Sikorski died.

Cast 

Krzysztof Pieczyński as General Władysław Sikorski
 Kamila Baar as Zofia Leśniowska, Sikorski's daughter
 Jerzy Grałek as Governor Noel Mason-Macfarlane
 Tomasz Sobczak as Jan Gralewski
 Marieta Żukowska as Alicja Iwańska
Łukasz Simlat as Zygmnut Biały
Mirosław Haniszewski as Capitan Edward Prchal
Piotr Miazga as Major William S. Herring
Marcin Bosak as Ensign Józef Ponikiewski
Ireneusz Czop as Perry

References

External links
 
 Movie website

2009 films
2000s historical films
Polish historical films
2000s Polish-language films
Films set in Gibraltar

World War II films based on actual events
Films set in 1943